James McNicholl Cameron Clark (born 1913, date of death unknown) was a Scottish professional footballer who played as a defender for Sunderland.

References

1913 births
Year of death missing
Footballers from Glasgow
Scottish footballers
Association football defenders
Clydebank Juniors F.C. players
Sunderland A.F.C. players
Plymouth Argyle F.C. players
English Football League players